Limbayat is one of the 182 Legislative Assembly constituencies of Gujarat state in India. It is part of Surat district.

List of segments
This assembly seat represents the following segments,

 Surat City Taluka (Part) – Surat Municipal Corporation (Part) Ward No. – 35, 49, 50, 51, 52.

Member of Legislative Assembly

Election results

2022

2017

2012

See also
 List of constituencies of Gujarat Legislative Assembly
 Surat district

References

External links
 

Assembly constituencies of Gujarat
Surat district